The 2013 Seattle Reign FC season was the club's first season in the National Women's Soccer League, the top division of women's soccer in the United States.

Background 
In November 2012, it was confirmed that a Seattle-based women's professional soccer team owned by Bill Predmore (founder and president of Seattle-based digital marketing agency, POP) had been accepted into a new women's professional soccer league, later named National Women's Soccer League. Former general manager of the Seattle Sounders Women and  Seattle Sounders FC Director of Youth Programs, Amy Carnell, was named General Manager.

On December 21, 2012, the team announced Laura Harvey as their first head coach. Harvey was head coach of Arsenal L.F.C. from 2010–2012 after serving as an assistant for two years, assisted and then coached Birmingham City L.F.C. from 2002–2008, and served as an assistant coach for England's U-17, U-19 and U-23 women's national teams from 2005–2011.

Review

Drafts and signings
On January 11, 2013, as part of the NWSL Player Allocation, Kaylyn Kyle (CAN), Teresa Noyola (MEX), Megan Rapinoe (USA), Amy Rodriguez
(USA), Jenny Ruiz (MEX), Hope Solo (USA), and Emily Zurrer (CAN) were named to the Seattle team. On January 18, the Reign selected Christine Nairn, Mallory Schaffer, Kristen Meier, and Haley Kopmeyer at the 2013 NWSL College Draft. On February 4, 2013, it was announced that the team had signed four free agents: Kate Deines, Jessica Fishlock, Tiffany Cameron, and Lindsay Taylor. During the February 7, 2013 NWSL Supplemental Draft, the team selected Nikki Krzysik, Lauren Barnes, Laura Heyboer, Liz Bogus, Michelle Betos and Kaley Fountain.

Preseason
Leading into the preseason, it was learned that the Reign would be without all of their U.S. national team allocated players for almost half of the season. National team forward, Amy Rodriguez, announced she was pregnant with her first child and would not be playing during the inaugural season.  U.S. national team goalkeeper, Hope Solo, would be away for the first part of the season after recovering from wrist surgery and Megan Rapinoe had signed with French side, Olympique Lyonnais, from January to June and would miss at least nine games.

Regular season 
After traveling to Japan in the preseason to play matches against defending L. League champion INAC Kobe Leonessa, Fukuoka J. Anclas, and Nojima Stella Kanagawa, the Reign faced their first regular season match against the Chicago Red Stars at Benedictine University, in which Seattle's first college draft pick, Christine Nairn, scored the Reign's first goal of the season via a header off an assist from Liz Bogus. The Red Stars later tied the game 1–1, but the point that Seattle earned in the game would be its only for the next nine games. Without the U.S. national team players or a veteran goalscorer up front, the team struggled to win games. Although the losses were for the most part consistently low-scoring games, it was apparent that the Reign was missing some final ingredients for success.

In June 2013, head coach Laura Harvey began making some trades and signing new players. Forward and Canadian international, Tiffany Cameron was waived, later to be picked up by FC Kansas City and former U.S. national team defender, Stephanie Cox was added to the roster. Mexican allocated player and former Stanford Cardinal standout, Teresa Noyola, was traded to FC Kansas City for Renae Cuellar, and Noyola's fellow former Stanford Cardinal goal-scorer, Lindsay Taylor was traded to the Washington Spirit. After a brief stint on the team by Tobagonian international, Kennya Cordner who was later waived and replaced by Australian national team co-captain, Emily van Egmond due to the league's restriction on only having two international players on a team (in addition to allocated players), and the return of U.S. national team players, Solo and Rapinoe, the Reign began to turn the season around with a 1–1 tie against the Western New York Flash. The game would be the first of a six-game undefeated streak for the Reign with two ties and four wins.  After losing to regional rival, Portland Thorns FC, 2–1 in the season finale in front of a sold-out crowd of 3,855, the Reign ended the 2013 NWSL season seventh in the league with a 5–14–3 record.

Club

Executive staff

Coaching staff

Roster

Competitions

Preseason and friendlies

Regular season

Standings

Results summary

Results by round

Statistics

Appearances and goals

Top scorers
Players with one goal or more included only.

Top assists
Players with one assist or more included only.

Disciplinary record 
Players with 1 card or more included only.

Goalkeeper stats 
Last updated: August 20, 2013

Player Transactions

Transfers In

Transfers Out

Honors and awards

NWSL Player of the Week

Reign FC Player of the Match

See also 
 2013 National Women's Soccer League season

References 

OL Reign seasons
Seattle Reign
Seattle Reign
Seattle Reign
Seattle Reign